The Bristol Waterfront Historic District is a historic district encompassing the original heart of Bristol, Rhode Island, which was laid out in 1680 by the town's original proprietors.  It stretches from Bristol Harbor to the east side of Wood St., as far north as Washington Street, and south to Walker Cove.  The district's principal areas of importance are the waterfront area on the west side, and the Town Common, part of the original layout, which forms the civic heart of the town.  It is one of the few planned communities in the state, and the only one of such great age.  The district features residential, civic, and commercial architecture encompassing most of its more than three centuries of existence.  Its 19th-century architecture is particularly strong in examples of the work of native son Russell Warren.

The district was listed on the National Register of Historic Places in 1975.  Major buildings in the district which are separately listed on the National Register include the Bristol County Jail, Bristol County Courthouse, and the Bristol Customshouse and Post Office.

See also
National Register of Historic Places listings in Bristol County, Rhode Island

References

Historic districts in Bristol County, Rhode Island
Bristol, Rhode Island
Historic districts on the National Register of Historic Places in Rhode Island